O'Brian is an Irish surname and may refer to:

People named O'Brian

Forename
 O'Brian White (born 1985), Jamaican footballer
 O'Brian Woodbine (born 1988), Jamaican footballer

Surname
 Conor O'Brian (born 1980), a ring name of American professional wrestler Ryan Parmeter
 Hugh O'Brian (1925–2016), stage name of American actor Hugh Krampe
 Jack O'Brian (1914–2000), columnist and supporter of Joseph McCarthy
 Katy O'Brian (born 1989), American actress
 Michael John O'Brian (1928–2002), Pakistan Air Force air vice-marshal 
 Patrick O'Brian (1914–2000), pen name of British novelist and translator Richard Russ
 Peter O'Brian (actor)  (born 1956), New Zealand/Indonesian actor
 Peter O'Brian (film producer) (born 1947), Canadian film producer

Fictional people named O'Brian
Chloe O'Brian, a character in the American TV series 24
Morris O'Brian, a character in the American TV series 24

See also
O'Brien (surname), alternate Anglicization of surname (also O'Bryan)
Dara Ó Briain, Irish comedian and presenter

Anglicised Irish-language surnames